Hasanabad (also Romanized as Ḩasanābād; also known as Hasan Abad Poshtkooh) is a village in Poshtkuh Rural District, in the Central District of Khansar County, Isfahan Province, Iran. At the 2006 census, its population was 50, in 14 families.

References 

Populated places in Khansar County